Felimare alaini is a species of sea slug or dorid nudibranch, a marine gastropod mollusc in the family Chromodorididae.

Description
The length of the species attains 40 mm.

Distribution 
This species was described from two specimens collected at  depth at Port Louis, Guadeloupe,  and a paratype from Petit Havre, Guadeloupe. It was reported from Saint Martin as Hypselodoris cf. acriba and from Anguilla, British West Indies, as Hypselodoris acriba.

References

 Ortea, J.; Espinosa, J.; Buske, Y.; Caballer, M. (2013). Additions to the inventory of the sea slugs (Opisthobranchia and Sacoglossa) from Guadeloupe (Lesser Antilles, Caribbean Sea). Revista de la Academia Canaria de Ciencias. 25: 163-194

External links
 Epstein, H. E.; Hallas, J. M.; Johnson, R. F.; Lopez, A.; Gosliner, T. M. (2018). Reading between the lines: revealing cryptic species diversity and colour patterns in Hypselodoris nudibranchs (Mollusca: Heterobranchia: Chromodorididae). Zoological Journal of the Linnean Society. 48: 1-74

Chromodorididae
Gastropods described in 2013